Waddell Creek may refer to:

Waddell Creek (California)
Waddell Creek (Black River tributary), a stream in Washington